The Museum of Oltenia is a multidisciplinary museum in the city of Craiova, Oltenia, Romania.

The archaeology section of museum was founded on 1 April 1915. The natural history section was founded in 1923 and the museum as it is structured today was established in 1928.

The museum is divided into three sections housed in separate buildings: ethnography, history/archaeology, and natural history. The collection is based on donations made in 1908.

The building on Matei Basarab Street dates from the 15th century and is one of the oldest in the city. It houses the ethnography exhibits. The building on Popa Street is the location of the natural history section and also a traditional pottery shop. The building on Madona Dudu Street houses the archaeology and history exhibits, including a new wing. The museum is an important tourist attraction in Craiova.

The museum is housed in a former girls' school; the building dates to 1905, and is listed as a historic monument by Romania's Ministry of Culture and Religious Affairs.

See also
 Craiova Art Museum

References

External links

 Museum of Oltenia website  (works with Firefox browser)

1915 establishments in Romania
Museums established in 1915
Ethnographic museums in Romania
History museums in Romania
Archaeological museums in Romania
Natural history museums in Romania
Museums in Craiova
Historic monuments in Dolj County
Oltenia